Thelma Coyne and Nancye Wynne claimed their third consecutive domestic title, defeating Dorothy Bundy and Dorothy Workman 9–7, 6–4 in the final, to win the women's doubles tennis title at the 1938 Australian Championships.

Seeds

  Dorothy Bundy /  Dorothy Workman (final)
  Thelma Coyne /  Nancye Wynne (champions)
  Nell Hopman /  Dot Stevenson (quarterfinals)
  Joan Hartigan /  Emily Hood Westacott (semifinals)

Draw

Draw

References

External links
  Sources for seedings

1938 in tennis
1938 in women's tennis
1938 in Australian women's sport
Women's Doubles